The IMOCA 60 Class yacht PRB 4 was designed by Lauriot-Prévost and G. Verdier and launched in the 2010 after being assembled by CDK Technologies based in Lorient, France. The hull was moulded in those of Safran and manufactured at the Larros Shipyard in Gujan Mestras under the direction of Thierry Elluère. The deck will was made at CDK technologies in Port la Forêt. In Italy, near Milan, Refraschini manufacture the internal structure of the boat. The initial keel was made by AMPM, Mothe Achard.

While sailing in the 2020-2021 Vendee Globe with French skipper Kevin Escoffier, who reported issues with a valve at the starboard foil on the 22 November, it suddenly sank on the 30 November, 2000 kilometers south-west of Cape of Good Hope. At the time the skipper was in third and was found in his life raft by skipper Jean Le Cam, who was only thirty miles behind him, when he triggered his emergency beacon. Jean Le Cam was saved in the 2008-2009 Vendee Globe by none other than PRB 3 skipper Vincent Riou at Cape Horn. After having found him Jean Le Cam lost visual contact with Kevin Escoffier as it turned night. Eventually three boats were searching for Kevin- and he was rescued by Le Cam the following morning.

Racing Results

References 

2010s sailing yachts
Sailing yachts designed by VPLP
Vendée Globe boats
IMOCA 60